Doug Powell may refer to:

 Doug Powell (musician, apologist)
 Doug Powell (food safety), food safety expert that formerly worked at Kansas State University and now lives in Australia
 Doug Powell (geographer), professor at UC Berkeley